Ying Chen (born February 20, 1961) is a Chinese Canadian author. She writes mostly in French and also translates her own works into Chinese and English.

Biography
Born in 1961 in Shanghai, she now lives in Vancouver and is the mother of two children.  She obtained a degree in French language and literature from Fudan University (复旦大学) in 1983 and worked as a translator and interpreter before moving to Montreal in 1989. She later lived in Magog, Quebec before moving to Vancouver in 2003.

Ying Chen's novels include La mémoire de l'eau, Les lettres chinoises, L'ingratitude (which won the Prix Québec-Paris, and was published in the U.S. as "Ingratitude," translated by Carol Volk, and published in China as "再见妈妈", self-translated), Immobile (which won the Prix Alfred-DesRochers), Le champ dans la mer (published in China as "V家花园", self-translated), Querelle d'un squelette avec son double (self-translated and published on Amazon as "Skeleton and its double"), "Le Mangeur", "Un Enfant à ma porte", "Espèces", "La Rive est loin". She wrote two books of essays: "Quatre mille marches" and "La Lenteur des montagnes". She practices a lean, polished and deceptively simple writing style, free of flourishes and excess verbiage. As a child, one of her schoolteachers once told her "the most simple is the most beautiful", and she has retained this idea.

See also
List of Quebec authors

External links
review and commentary on Immobile (in French)
China.com.cn interview (in Chinese)
 Interview with Ying Chen for Lingua Romana

References

1961 births
Living people
21st-century Canadian novelists
Chinese emigrants to Canada
Canadian writers of Asian descent
Canadian women novelists
Naturalized citizens of Canada
Short story writers from Shanghai
Fudan University alumni
21st-century Canadian women writers
Canadian novelists in French
Chinese women novelists
Chinese novelists
Canadian women short story writers
Chinese women short story writers
Chinese short story writers
French-language writers from China